Johann Gottlieb Christian Nörremberg (11 August 1787, in Pustenbach – 20 July 1862) was a German physicist who worked on the polarization of light.

From 1823 he taught classes in mathematics and physics at the military school in Darmstadt. In 1833 he became a professor of mathematics, physics and astronomy at the University of Tübingen, where he worked on surveying and the development of optical instruments. Among his better known creations was a polarization apparatus, a device used in the making of a "Nörremberg polariscope". Most of his scientific articles were published in Poggendorfs Annalen.

Notes

External links
 

1787 births
1862 deaths
19th-century German physicists
Academic staff of the University of Tübingen
People from Bergneustadt